Meed may refer to:

 Benjamin Meed (1918 – 2006), Jewish Holocaust Survivor
 Vladka Meed (1921 – 2012), Jewish Holocaust Survivor
 MEED, Middle East Economic Digest
 Thai term for knife

See also  
 Cato Mead (also spelled Meed)
 Mead (disambiguation)